This is a list of members of the European Parliament for Finland in the 2019 to 2024 session.

List 
On the National Coalition Party list: (EPP Group)

 Sirpa Pietikäinen
 Petri Sarvamaa
 Henna Virkkunen

On the Green League list: (Greens-EFA)

 Heidi Hautala
 Ville Niinistö
 Alviina Alametsä – since Brexit (1 February 2020)

On the Social Democratic Party list: (S&D)

 Eero Heinäluoma
 Miapetra Kumpula-Natri

On the Finns Party list: (ID)

 Teuvo Hakkarainen
 Laura Huhtasaari

On the Centre Party list: (Renew)

 Elsi Katainen
 Mauri Pekkarinen

On the Left Alliance list: (GUE–NGL)

 Silvia Modig

On the Swedish People's Party of Finland list: (Renew)

 Nils Torvalds

See also 
 2019 European Parliament election in Finland

References

External links 

2019
Finland
List